Paramjit S. Jaswal is an Indian academician, professor and presently the Vice Chancellor of SRM University, Haryana Delhi-NCR, Sonepat, Haryana. He is the former Vice Chancellor of Rajiv Gandhi National University of Law in Patiala, Punjab, India and the former Chairperson of Department of Laws, Panjab University, Chandigarh. 
Jaswal is the recipient of a Fulbright Scholar. Together with his wife Professor Nishta Jaswal, VC, HP, NLU, in 2018 they became the first couple to be Vice-Chancellors of the National Law Universities at the same time. In 2019 he was one of the organizers of the Rajiv Gandhi National University of Law's Mega Legal Services Camp.

Books
He has written a book on environmental Law published by the Alabad Law Agency which the Supreme Court has made reference on three separate occasions. He also wrote a chapter in the book 'Preventive Detention and Security Law: A Comparative Survey,' 'Human Rights and the Law,' Protection and Promotion of Human Rights in India,' among other publications.

References

External links

Year of birth missing (living people)
Living people
Indian legal writers
Scholars from Punjab, India